Samir Majid Sheikh (born 16 October 1978) is an English former first-class cricketer.

Sheikh was born at Southwark in October 1978 and matriculated to Newnham College at the University of Cambridge in 1997. While studying at Cambridge, he played first-class cricket for Cambridge University Cricket Club in 1999 and 2000, making six appearances, which included appearing twice in The University Match against Oxford. Playing in the Cambridge side as a right-arm medium-fast bowler, Sheikh took 12 wickets at an average of 36.41, best figures of 4 for 25. As a tailend batsman, he scored 26 runs with a highest score of 17.

References

External links

1978 births
Living people
People from Southwark
Alumni of Newnham College, Cambridge
English cricketers
British Asian cricketers
Cambridge University cricketers